The Royal Victoria Country Park is a country park in Netley, Hampshire, England, by the shores of Southampton Water. It comprises  of mature woodland and grassy parkland, as well as a small shingle beach.

From 1863 until 1966, the site was home to the Royal Victoria Hospital. The site was acquired by Hampshire County Council in 1969, who opened the park to the public in 1970.

All that remains of the hospital is the chapel, which acts as a heritage centre providing history of the hospital. It also has a  viewing tower, providing views over the park, and across Southampton Water to Hythe, and on a clear day, as far as Southampton itself.

The site also has a park office and tearooms. The building housing this was built using 100 different timbers from around the UK and British Empire. It was originally built in 1940 by the YMCA for entertainment, recreation and relaxation for staff and patients at the hospital.

The park is home to a large variety of fauna and flora.

The park can be reached on foot via a footpath from Netley Station, or there is ample car parking on site.

The Netley Military Cemetery to the rear of the hospital site, primarily for patients, is accessible to the public by a private footpath and with a lockable security fence, a key to which can be obtained from the shop next to the tearooms.  Among those buried here are 636 Commonwealth service personnel who died in the First World War and 35 in the Second World War whose graves are maintained and registered by the Commonwealth War Graves Commission, who also care for the war graves of 69 Germans and 12 Belgians from the First and of one Polish soldier from the Second war.

Southampton Water is an extremely busy shipping lane, with container ships and cruise liners, including the Queen Mary 2 using the port at Southampton as a base.

In January 2014 it was announced that a Heritage Lottery Fund grant of £102,000 would be used for restoring the chapel and revealing more detail of the former hospital.

See also
Netley Hospital
Netley
Southampton Water
Southampton
Royal Victoria Railway

References

External links
Royal Victoria Country Park information from Hampshire County Council
Royal Victoria Railway

Country parks in Hampshire